Olfactores is a clade within the Chordata that comprises the Tunicata (Urochordata) and the Vertebrata (sometimes referred to as Craniata). Olfactores represent the overwhelming majority of the phylum Chordata, as the Cephalochordata are the only chordates not included in the clade. This clade is defined by a more advanced olfactory system which, in the immediate vertebrate generation, caused the appearance of nostrils.

A rudimentary neural crest is present in tunicates, implying its presence in the olfactores ancestor also, as vertebrates have a true neural crest. For this reason, they are also known as Cristozoa.

Olfactores hypothesis 
While the hypothesis that Cephalochordata is a sister taxon to Craniata is of long standing and was once widely accepted—likely influenced by significant tunicate morphological apomorphies from other chordates, with cephalochordates even being nicknamed ‘honorary vertebrates’—studies since 2006 analyzing large sequencing datasets strongly support Olfactores as a clade. The name Olfactores comes from Latin *olfactores ("smellers," from purposive supine olfactum of olfacio, "to smell," with plural masculine agentive nominalizing suffix -tores), due to the development of pharyngeal respiratory and sensory functions, in contrast with cephalochordates such as the lancelet which lack a respiratory system and specialized sense organs.

References

 
Chordates